Massone may refer to:

 Massone (surname), an Italian surname
 Massone (company), a pharmaceutical company based in Buenos Aires, Argentina
 , a village of Arco, Trentino, Italy
 Monte Massone, a mountain of the Pennine Alps

See also 
 Masone (disambiguation)
 Massoni